Dorothy Garlock (June 22, 1919 – April 6, 2018) was an American author of over 50 historical romance novels, most of them set in the American West. Many of her books became bestsellers. She also wrote under the pen names Johanna Phillips, Dorothy Phillips and Dorothy Glenn.

Biography
Dorothy Garlock was born on June 22, 1919, in Texas, but spent twenty-five years in Oklahoma City. She and her husband moved to Clear Lake, Iowa, in 1955. Garlock worked for fourteen years as a bookkeeper and columnist for the local newspaper before retiring at age 49. To fill her time while she and her husband spent winters in a small south-Texas town, Garlock began to write stories. She completed four manuscripts before she decided to try to publish one of them. In 1976, she entered one of her books in a contest for unpublished writers. Although it did not win the contest, one of the judges, an agent, offered to represent her. He sold all four of her books in a few weeks.

Over 20 million copies of Garlock's books are in print in 18 languages and 36 countries. She was one of the six launch authors for Bantam Books' Loveswept Line. Two of Garlock's short stories, "Interlude in Big Bend" and "Beneath the Midnight Sun", were chosen by Universal Press Syndicate to launch their series Day Dreams. The two stories were published one chapter each day for one month, and ran in 57 major newspapers. Her novel A Love for All Time has been used as an example in the textbook Writing Romantic Fiction, by Helen Barnhardt. Garlock is also a member of the Romance Writers Hall of Fame.

Garlock donated many of her manuscripts and other unpublished writings to the University of Iowa libraries. She and her husband, Herb Garlock Sr., lived in Clear Lake, Iowa. They have a son and daughter and several grandsons.

Dorothy Garlock on died April 6, 2018 at the age of 98.

Awards
 1985 - Affaire de Coeur Silver Pen Award
 1986 - Romantic Times Magazine Outstanding Western Writer
 1986 - Affaire de Coeur Silver Pen Award
 1987 - Affaire de Coeur Silver Pen Award
 1988 - Affaire de Coeur Silver Pen Award
 1988 - Reviewer Choice Award, Best Western Trilogy
 1989 - Affaire de Coeur Silver Pen Award
 1989 - Favorite Historical Author
 1990 - Reviewer Choice Award, Best Western Saga
 1991 - Romantic Times Award for Best Americana Novel
 1997 - Romantic Times Lifetime Achievement Award

Bibliography

As Dorothy Garlock

Stand alone novels
 Love and Cherish (1980)
 The Searching Hearts (1982)
 Glorious Dawn (1982)
 A Love for All Time (1983)
 The Planting Season (1984)
 Homeplace (1991)
 A Gentle Giving (1993)
 Tenderness (1993)
 Forever Victoria (1993)
 She Wanted Red Velvet (1996)
 This Loving Land (1996)
 More Than Memory (2001)
 Train from Marietta (2006)
 On Tall Pine Lake (2007)
 Will You Still Be Mine? (2007)
 The moon looked down(2009)

The family Tucker series
 Keep a Little Secret
 Stay a Littler Longer
 Come a Little Closer

Annie Lash series
 Wild Sweet Wilderness (1985)
 Annie Lash (1994)
 Almost Eden (1995)

Colorado Wind series
 Restless Wind (1986)
 Wayward Wind (1986)
 Wind of Promise (1987)

Wabash River series
 Lonesome River (1987)
 Dream River (1988)
 River of Tomorrow (1988)
 Yesteryear (1995)

Wyoming Frontier series
 Midnight Blue (1989)
 Nightrose (1990)
 Sins of Summer (1994)
 The Listening Sky (1996)
 Larkspur (1997)
 Sweetwater (1990)

Dolan Brothers series
 Ribbon in the Sky (1991)
 With Hope (1998)
 With Song (1999)
 With Heart (1999)
 After the Parade (2000)
 Will You Still Be Mine?: With Heart / After The Parade (Omnibus) (2007)

Jazz Age series
 The Edge of Town (2001)
 High on a Hill (2002)
 A Place Called Rainwater (2003)
 River Rising (2005)

Route 66 series
 Mother Road (2003)
 Hope's Highway (2004)
 Song of the Road (2004)

Omnibus
 Dreamkeepers: Strange Possession / Marriage To A Strange (2005)
 Wishmakers: Hidden Dreams / She Wanted Red Velvet (2006)
 Loveseekers: Sing Softly To Me / Gentle Torment (2007)

As Johanna Phillips
(Reedited as Dorothy Garlock)

Single novels
 Gentle Torment (1981)
 Strange Possession (1982)
 Passion's Song (1982)
 Amber-Eyed Man (1982)
 Hidden Dreams (1983)

As Dorothy Phillips

Single novels
(Reedited as Dorothy Garlock)
 Marriage to a Stranger (1982)
 She Wanted Red Velvet (1986)
 Sing Softly to Me (1986)

As Dorothy Glenn
(Reedited as Dorothy Garlock)

Single novels
 Sunshine Every Morning (1985)
 The Hell Raiser (1990)

Anthologies in collaboration
 The Gentleman / The Hell Raiser (1997) (with Kristin James)
 A Daddy Again (1998) (with Dixie Browning and Joan Hohl)

Sources

 
 
 

1919 births
2018 deaths
American romantic fiction writers
Writers from Oklahoma City
People from Clear Lake, Iowa
Novelists from Oklahoma
Novelists from Iowa
Novelists from Texas
American women novelists
Women romantic fiction writers
20th-century American novelists
20th-century American women writers
21st-century American novelists
21st-century American women writers
People from Grand Saline, Texas